Infinite Flight is an amateur flight simulator developed by Infinite Flight LLC. The game is available for Android and iOS.

Gameplay
The simulator includes single-player and multi-player modes, including an option to play as air traffic control. As a mobile game, Infinite Flight relies on the device's accelerometer for flight control.

Reception 

In a 2011 review, Windows Central wrote that the simulator got better with experience and would likely appeal to fans of the genre. In 2012, The Mac Observer gave the first release a score of 2.5/5 ("Disappointing"), comparing it negatively to other flight simulators. In 2014, Engadget considered Infinite Flight one of the best on the App Store and The New York Times called it the best on mobile devices. FlightSim.com later wrote approvingly of the just-released C-130 aircraft, saying that the game's newer models were much better than earlier models.

References

External links 
 

2011 video games
Android (operating system) games
Flight simulation video games
IOS games
Video games developed in the United States
Windows Phone games
General flight simulators